St. Theresa's College of Cebu (STC), is a private Catholic institution of basic and higher learning run by the sisters of the Immaculate Heart of Mary in Cebu City, Philippines. It was founded by the Immaculate heart of Mary sisters on June 1, 1933 upon the invitation of Monsignor Gabriel Reyes, then Archbishop of Cebu.

The institution offers all levels of instruction for boys and girls from preschool to Grade 6, for girls exclusively in junior high school (grades 7-10), and for men and women in senior high school (grades 11 & 12) and college.

About STC

History
St. Theresa's College of Cebu (formerly known as St. Theresa's Academy of Cebu), was founded by the Missionary Sisters of St. Augustine of Cebu (now the Missionary Sisters of the Immaculate Heart of Mary) on June 1, 1933 upon the expressed invitation of Msgr. Gabriel Reyes (then the Archbishop of Cebu).

The institution first operated in Sikatuna Street, Cebu City, while school buildings were being erected on its present site, bounded by General Maxilom Avenue (Mango Avenue), Juana Osmeña Street, Redemptorist Road, and Ramon Aboitiz Street (Elizabeth Pond Street).

In 1935, the college department was opened. Liberal Arts, Education, and Commerce undergraduate courses were offered. These three courses were fully recognized by the Bureau of Education in 1940.

After the outbreak of World War II in 1941, only the primary grades were reopened in 1945 as all the school buildings were destroyed by fire and bombs. The following year, high school classes were resumed in temporary shacks. The buildings were rebuilt from 1946 to 1955. The latest additions were built in 1960 and 1965.

In 1957, St. Theresa's College of Cebu became a Charter Member of the Philippine Accrediting Association of Schools, Colleges, and Universities (PAASCU) and has satisfactorily maintained its accredited status.
St. Theresa's College, High School Department was accredited in 1970 and reaccredited in 1973, 1979, 1985, 1991, 1995, and 2005.

It is also a member of the Catholic Educational Association of the Philippines (CEAP).

In 2008, St. Theresa's College celebrated its Diamond Jubilee Year.

Patron Saint
Teresa de Avila, the first woman doctor of the Church, is the patron saint of St. Theresa’s College.

Incorporation
St. Theresa's College of Cebu, was originally incorporated in accordance with Philippine Laws on March 29, 1935. After World War II, the Articles of Incorporation were duly reconstituted and with the Securities and Exchange Commission, Manila, October 1948. The transcript of these amended Articles of Incorporation was issued on September 8, 1949. In February 1991, the papers of Incorporation registered at the Securities and Exchange Commission were revised.

Until August 1991 the members of the Board of Trustees of St. Theresa's College Cebu were the ICM District Superior and her Council. As of 2016, St. Theresa's College Cebu is governed by a separate Board of Trustees with ten members, six of whom are ICMs and four non-ICMs.

Academic programs

Basic Education
Kindergarten to Grade 12

College

Liberal Arts
Bachelor of Arts in Communication
Major in Corporate Communication
Major in Media Communication
Bachelor of Arts in Psychology
Bachelor of Science in Psychology
Major in Counseling Psychology
Major in Industrial Psychology

Education

Bachelor of Secondary Education
Major in English
Major in Mathematics
Bachelor of Elementary Education
General Education
Pre-School Education
Special Needs Education

Social Work
Bachelor of Science in Social Work

Management and Accountancy
Bachelor of Science in Accountancy
Bachelor of Science in Business Administration
Major in Entrepreneurial Management
Major in Marketing Management

Diploma Courses
Certificate Course in Community Development
 The course is designed to aid aspiring community organizers to gain basic knowledge and understanding of community development work. The course provides both theory and practice. 
Diploma in Professional Education
This is designed for students who wish to take the Licensure Examination for Teachers in the Pre-School, Elementary, and Secondary Levels, but whose educational qualifications are not those degrees expressly prescribed in the law. This program provides the student the opportunity to pursue teacher education.
Diploma in Teaching Special Education

Notable alumni

Daisy Ba-ad – playwright, stage director, composer, motivational speaker and life coach
Gwendolyn Garcia – politician
Gwendolyn Ecleo – politician
Emmarie "Lolypop" Ouano-Dizon - political figure
Laurice Guillen – director, actress
  Anna Maris Igpit – beauty pageant titleholder
Monique Lhuillier – Filipino fashion designer based in the United States
Cecilia Manguerra Brainard – novelist
Deanna Wong – Volleyball Player

See also
Saint Theresa's College of Quezon City
Christ the King College, San Fernando, La Union

References

External links
 
 Missionary Sisters of the Immaculate Heart of Mary Philippines
 The arrival of the ICM missionaries in the Philippines
 

Catholic universities and colleges in the Philippines
Catholic elementary schools in the Philippines
Catholic secondary schools in the Philippines
Girls' schools in the Philippines
Universities and colleges in Cebu City
Educational institutions established in 1933
1933 establishments in the Philippines